The Gideon Ives House is a historic house at 110 East Jefferson Street in New Boston, Illinois. Gideon Ives, the co-owner of Mercer County's largest general merchandise and grain wholesale business, had the house built for his family in 1857. The house is an early example of the Italianate style; its design mirrors the house across the street, which was built for Ives' business partner, Elmore J. Dennison. The house's roof features bracketed eaves and is topped by a square cupola, and its windows are tall and narrow with cast iron hoods. The entrance is flanked by pilasters, a Greek Revival element; the style was still popular at the time, and its presence reflects the transition between Greek Revival and Italianate as popular American architectural styles.

The house was added to the National Register of Historic Places on November 8, 2000.

References

Houses on the National Register of Historic Places in Illinois
Italianate architecture in Illinois
Houses completed in 1857
Houses in Mercer County, Illinois
National Register of Historic Places in Mercer County, Illinois
1857 establishments in Illinois